Ché Ahn is an American Christian pastor. Ahn is pastor of Harvest Rock Church in Pasadena, California. He leads Harvest International Ministry and is part of the "New Apostolic Reformation" movement. In 2000, Ahn was a leader in the evangelical youth movement TheCall. He is also the International Chancellor of Wagner University, an unaccredited institution in Rancho Cucamonga.

Ahn is involved in supporting Republican politics. At a Stop The Steal rally held shortly before the 2021 storming of the United States Capitol, he told an audience, “I believe that this week we’re going to throw Jezebel out and Jehu’s gonna rise up, and we’re gonna rule and reign through President Trump and under the lordship of Jesus Christ."

Ahn wrote Fire Evangelism: Reaching the Lost Through Love And Power, which was published in 2006; Spirit-Led Evangelism: Reaching the Lost through Love and Power, which was published in 2008; When Heaven Comes Down: Experiencing God's Glory in Your Life, which was published in 2009; Say Goodbye to Powerless Christianity: Walking in Supernatural Surrender and Significance, which was also published in 2009; The Grace of Giving: Unleashing the Power of a Generous Heart, which was published in 2013. 

Ahn is Korean American.

References

1956 births
20th-century Protestant religious leaders
21st-century American male writers
21st-century American non-fiction writers
21st-century Protestant religious leaders
American Charismatics
American Christian clergy
American Christian writers
American male non-fiction writers
Fuller Theological Seminary alumni
Living people
Protestant writers
South Korean emigrants to the United States
Writers from Pasadena, California